Rāṇāditya Satya (formerly read Raṇa Datasatya on his coins), was a ruler in the area of Sindh, modern-day Pakistan, in the 5-6th centuries CE, probably circa 480 CE. The name "Rāṇāditya" is otherwise known, and it appears in several parts of the  Rajatarangini.

His coins employ a sun symbol together with the portrait of the ruler, and have on the reverse a of fire of the type seen on Sasanian coinage, in which the traditional attendants of Sasanian coinage are replaced by a legend in Brahmi script. The legend in Brahmi reads   Rāṇāditya Satya.

The coins of Rāṇāditya Satya are considered as modelled on the coins of Peroz I, particularly from the portrait type.

These coins are the latest known of the series of Sasanian-type "coinage of Sindh", which were minted in the area of Sindh in modern Pakistan, from Multan to the mouth of the Indus river, on the model the coinage of Sasanian Empire rulers Shapur II down to Peroz I, and are covering approximately the period from 325 to 480 CE. Sasanian rulers from the reign of Shapur I did claim control of the Sindh area in their inscriptions. Shapur I installed his son Narseh as "King of the Sakas" in the areas of Eastern Iran as far as Sindh.

These coins are often attributed to the Hephthalite Huns, whose Alchon Huns tribe invaded India in the 5th century. According to R.C. Senior, Hunnic characteristics only appear on the later phases of the Sasanian coinage of Sindh, with the apparition of Hunnic Tamghas on the coinage, corresponding to the period when the Hephthalites took over Sasanian rule in India. The Sasanians may have been forced to cede the area of Sasanian Sindh to Hunnic tribes.

This type of coinage disappeared with the Arab conquest of Sindh, in the 8th century CE.

Ranaditya Satya is now often considered as the first ruler of the Rai dynasty of Sindh. He has been tentatively identified with the ruler named Rai Diwaji (Devaditya) in Arab sources, and may have ruled circa 524 CE.

References

Hephthalites